Humaira Begum (24 July 1918 – 26 June 2002) was the wife and first cousin of King Mohammed Zahir Shah and the last queen consort of Afghanistan.

Marriage

Humaira Begum was the daughter of Sardar Ahmad Shah Khan, brother of the royal consort Mah Parwar Begum and Minister of the Royal Court, and his first wife Zarin Begum, who was cousin of King Amanullah Khan and eldest daughter of General H.E. Loinab Khush Dil Khan, Governor of Kabul and Kandahar. She married her first cousin, the Crown Prince of Afghanistan Mohammed Zahir on 7 November 1931 in Kabul.

Mohammed Zahir Shah and Humaira Begum had six sons and two daughters:

 Princess Bilqis Begum (born 17 April 1932).
 Prince Muhammed Akbar Khan (4 August 1933 – 26 November 1942).
 Crown Prince Ahmad Shah (born 23 September 1934).
 Princess Maryam Begum (2 November 1936 – 25 December 2021).
 Prince Muhammed Nadir Khan (21 May 1941 – 3 April 2022).
 Prince Shah Mahmoud Khan (15 November 1946 – 7 December 2002).
 Prince Muhammed Daoud Pashtunyar Khan (born 14 April 1949).
 Prince Mir Wais Khan (born 7 January 1957).

Queen of Afghanistan

On 8 November 1933 after the assassination of her father in law Mohammed Nadir Shah her husband was proclaimed King and Humaira became Queen of Afghanistan.

During the first part of her husband's reign, Queen Humaira did not play a big public role. King Amanullah Khan had been deposed in 1929 because of discontent partially caused by the example of Queen Soraya Tarzi, who appeared in public with her husband unveiled, and his successor reinstated the veil and gender seclusion and caused a backlash in women's rights. During the 1930s, the royal women continued to dress in Western fashion inside the enclosed royal palace compound of Kabul, but reverted to covering themselves in the traditional veil when they left the royal compound, and no longer showed themselves in public. 

This changed after the Second World War, when modernization reforms were seen as necessary by the government, including reforms in women's position. In 1946, Queen Humaira became the protector of the newly founded Women's Welfare Association, which was the first-ever Women's Institute in Afghanistan, and signified resuming the women's movement. When Mohammed Daoud Khan became Prime Minister in 1953, the development toward women's emancipation started to move faster, and the women of the Royal Family, with the Queen as the central figure, were given an important task as role models in this process. They started to attend public functions, initially veiled.

In 1959, she supported the call by the Prime minister Mohammed Daoud Khan for women to voluntary remove their veil by removing her own.
This was a big event in the history of women in Afghanistan, and it was also an intentional part of the women's emancipation policy of the Daoud Government at that time. The step was carefully prepared by introducing women workers at the Radio Kabul in 1957, sending women delegates to the Asian Women's Conference in Kairo, and employing forty girls to the government pottery factory in 1958. When this was met with no riots, the government decided it was time for the very controversial step of unveiling. In August 1959 therefore, on the second day of the festival of Jeshyn, Queen Humaira and Princess Bilqis appeared in the royal box at the military parade unveiled, alongside the Prime Minister's wife, Zamina Begum.

This controversial step was met with indignation by the Islamic clergy, and a group of clerics sent a letter of protest to the Prime minister to protest and demand that the words of sharia be respected. The Prime minister answered by inviting them to the capital and present proof to him that the holy scripture indeed demanded the chadri. When the clerics could not find such a passage, the Prime Minister declared that the female members of the Royal Family would no longer wear veils, as the Islamic law did not demand it. While the chadri was never banned, the example of the Queen and the Prime Minister's wife was followed by the wives and daughters of government officials as well as several urban women of the upper- and middle class, with Kubra Noorzai and Masuma Esmati-Wardak known as the first pioneers among the common citizens.

After this event, Queen Humaira participated in royal representational tasks and attended public functions unveiled. She engaged in charity and visited hospitals and public events.

Exile

On 17 July 1973, while her husband was in Italy undergoing eye surgery as well as therapy for lumbago, his cousin and former Prime Minister Mohammed Daoud Khan, who had been removed from office by Zahir Shah a decade earlier, staged a coup d'état and established a republican government. In the August following this coup, Zahir Shah abdicated rather than risk an all-out civil war. Queen Humaira had remained in Afghanistan when her husband departed to Italy for his surgery, and was thus present in Afghanistan during the coup. She was not harmed, but kept in house arrest in her residence, as several other members of the Royal Family, until they were allowed to depart to join Zahir Shah in Italy.

Humaira and Zahir Shah spent their twenty-nine years in exile in Italy living in a relatively modest four-bedroom villa in the affluent community of Olgiata on Via Cassia, north of the city of Rome. The king had never put money into foreign bank accounts, and thus depended on the generosity of friends.

Death
Just weeks before she was to return to Afghanistan and be reunited with her husband who recently had returned, Begum was admitted to hospital with breathing problems and heart trouble and died two days later.

Her body was returned to Afghanistan and was greeted at the airport by military personnel, tribal representatives in traditional robes, and cabinet ministers from Hamid Karzai's government. Memorial and funeral services were also held for her in two Kabul mosques. Her remains were buried in the Royal Mausoleum in Kabul.

Honours

National honours 
  Knight Grand Cordon of the Order of the Supreme Sun

Foreign honours 
 : Grand Cross of the Order of the Legion of Honour
 : Grand Cross of the Order of Merit of the Federal Republic of Germany, Special Issue
  Iranian Imperial Family: Dame Grand Cordon of the Imperial Order of the Pleiades, 1st Class
 : Paulownia Dame Grand Cordon of the Order of the Precious Crown

Ancestry

References

External links
 Dinner in honor of King Mohammad Zahir Shah of Afghanistan

Afghan royal consorts
Afghan feminists
1918 births
2002 deaths
Grand Crosses Special Class of the Order of Merit of the Federal Republic of Germany
Grand Cordons of the Order of the Precious Crown
Grand Croix of the Légion d'honneur
Afghan expatriates in Italy
Afghan exiles
Pashtun women